Eva González (born 1980) is a Spanish beauty pageant winner who represented her country at the Miss Universe 2003 pageant.

Eva González may also refer to:
Eva González (writer) (1918–2007), Leonese language writer
Eva Gonzalès (1849–1883), French Impressionist painter
Eva González (footballer) (born 1987), Argentine footballer